The 1959 Brown Bears football team was an American football team that represented Brown University during the 1959 NCAA University Division football season. Brown finished second-to-last in the Ivy League. 

In their first season under head coach John McLaughry, the Bears compiled a 2–6–1 record and were outscored 139 to 51. R. Carlin was the team captain.  

The Bears' 1–5–1 conference record placed seventh in the Ivy League. They were outscored by Ivy opponents 106 to 31. 

Brown played its home games at Brown Stadium in Providence, Rhode Island.

Schedule

References

Brown
Brown Bears football seasons
Brown Bears football